Lee Sang-gi (born 8 March 1987) is a South Korean footballer who played as a goalkeeper.

External links 
 
 

1987 births
Living people
Association football goalkeepers
South Korean footballers
Seongnam FC players
Suwon Samsung Bluewings players
Gimcheon Sangmu FC players
Suwon FC players
Gangwon FC players
Seoul E-Land FC players
K League 1 players
K League 2 players
Sungkyunkwan University alumni